Estonia is a European Parliament constituency for elections in the European Union covering the member state of Estonia. It is currently represented by seven Members of the European Parliament. The elections uses the D'Hondt method with an open list.

Members of the European Parliament

Elections

2004

The 2004 European election was the sixth election to the European Parliament. However, as Estonia had only joined the European Union earlier that month, it was the first election European election held in that state. The election took place on 13 June.

The biggest winner was the Social Democratic Party. The governing Res Publica Party and People's Union polled poorly. The voter turnout in Estonia was one of the lowest of all member countries at only 26.8%. A similar trend was visible in most of the new member states that joined the EU in 2004.

2009

The 2009 European election was the seventh election to the European Parliament and the fourth for Estonia.

2014

The 2014 European election was the eighth election to the European Parliament and the fifth for Estonia.

2019

The 2019 European election was the ninth election to the European Parliament and the sixth for Estonia.

References

External links
 European Election News by European Election Law Association (Eurela)
 List of MEPs europarl.europa.eu

 
Electoral districts of Estonia
European Parliament constituencies
2004 establishments in Estonia
Constituencies established in 2004